James Mitchell Chase (December 19, 1891January 1, 1945) was a Republican member of the U.S. House of Representatives from Pennsylvania.

Biography
J. Mitchell Chase was born in Glen Richey, Pennsylvania.  He graduated from the Dickinson School of Law in Carlisle, Pennsylvania, in 1916.  He was admitted to the bar in 1919 and commenced practice in Clearfield, Pennsylvania.  During the First World War, he enlisted in the Air Service and served with the American Expeditionary Forces from 1917 to 1919.  He served as commander of the American Legion, Department of Pennsylvania, in 1924 and 1925.

Chase was elected as a Republican to the Seventieth, Seventy-first, and Seventy-second Congresses.  He was an unsuccessful candidate for renomination in 1932.  He resumed the practice of law and died in Clearfield.  Interment in Hillcrest Cemetery.

References
 Retrieved on 2008-02-10
The Political Graveyard

1891 births
1945 deaths
United States Army Air Service pilots of World War I
Pennsylvania lawyers
Republican Party members of the United States House of Representatives from Pennsylvania
20th-century American politicians
20th-century American lawyers